Pavlo Khudzik (29 April 1985 in Teofipol, Khmelnytskyi Oblast, Ukrainian SSR – 8 March 2015 in Zolotonosha, Cherkasy Oblast, Ukraine) was a professional Ukrainian football striker who played for FC Zorya Luhansk in forward position in the Ukrainian Premier League.

Career 
In 2002 he made is his first debtut playing for FC Krasyliv. In 2004, he signed a contract with FC Enerhetyk Burshtyn, and played one season with  the club. The same year, he then started playing for FC Lviv.

Death
He died in a Ukrainian hospital on 8 March, 2015, after a traffic accident.

References

External links
Profile on Official FC Lviv Website
Profile on EUFO
Profile on Football Squads

1985 births
2015 deaths
Ukrainian footballers
Ukrainian Premier League players
FC Enerhetyk Burshtyn players
FC Lviv players
FC Obolon-Brovar Kyiv players
FC Zorya Luhansk players
Road incident deaths in Ukraine
Association football forwards